Vyborgsky District is the name of several administrative and municipal districts in Russia.
Vyborgsky District, Leningrad Oblast, an administrative and municipal district of Leningrad Oblast
Vyborgsky District, Saint Petersburg, an administrative district of the federal city of Saint Petersburg

See also
Vyborgsky (disambiguation)

References